"Only the Strong Survive" is a song written by Jerry Butler, Kenny Gamble and Leon Huff and originally sung in 1968 by Jerry Butler, released on his album The Ice Man Cometh. It was the most successful single of his career, reaching #4 on the Billboard Hot 100 and was #1 for two weeks on the Billboard Black Singles Chart, in March and April 1969, respectively.

"Only the Strong Survive" was the first of two singles by Butler which were gold certified by the RIAA, selling over a million copies (the second was "Ain't Understanding Mellow" in 1972).

Elvis Presley (1969), Skeeter Davis (1969), Billy Paul (1977), Rod Stewart (2009) Larry Carlton (2010) and Bruce Springsteen (on his album of the same name) (2022) also recorded "Only The Strong Survive." Davis's version appeared on her album Maryfrances, released in August 1969, Presley's version on his " From Elvis in Memphis " album released in June 1969. In the UK, Billy Paul's version was released on the Philadelphia International label (PIR 5699). It entered the singles chart on November 17, 1977, had a chart life of seven weeks and a peak position of #33. Rod Stewart’s version was released as a bonus track on the UK release of his 25th studio album Soulbook reaching #9 on the UK Albums Chart.

Another version of this song was recorded by The Trammps in the Netherlands in 2003 and sounds very similar to Billy Paul's version. The song appears on the compilation album Only the Strong Survive (Sony), which oddly enough shows the remaining four group members on the cover. There is also an extended club mix of this song on this CD. The club mix was produced by Maas and Van der Weyde.

Chart history

Weekly charts

Year-end charts

References

External links
 

1968 songs
1969 singles
Jerry Butler songs
Songs written by Kenny Gamble
Songs written by Leon Huff
Songs written by Jerry Butler
Mercury Records singles
Philadelphia International Records singles